John Michael Murphy (August 3, 1926 – May 25, 2015) was a Democratic member of the U.S. House of Representatives from New York's  16th (1963–1973) and 17th (1973–1981) districts. He was convicted of taking bribes in the 1980 Abscam scandal.

Life and career
Murphy was born in Staten Island, New York City, New York, the son of Florence and Frank Murphy. He attended La Salle Military Academy, Amherst College, and the United States Military Academy at West Point.

Military service 
He served in the U.S. Army from August 1944 to July 1956, first as an enlisted man before receiving his commission after four years at West Point.  During his military service he received the Distinguished Service Cross and the Bronze Star, and was discharged as a captain.

Congress 
He was elected as a Democrat to the 88th U.S. Congress and to the eight succeeding Congresses (January 3, 1963 – January 3, 1981). After being indicted in the Abscam bribery scandal, he ran unsuccessfully for re-election in 1980.  Murphy was acquitted of bribery, but found guilty on lesser charges, and served 18 months in prison.

During his time in Congress he chaired committees dealing with maritime and oceanic matters. He was a life long friend of Anastasio Somoza since their days as students at West Point; while in office, Murphy opposed the Carter administrations efforts to remove Somoza.

Family 
His son, Mark Murphy, is a real-estate developer who worked as an aide to Bill de Blasio during his tenure as New York City Public Advocate. On January 19, 2012, Mark Murphy announced he would seek election to the Congressional seat his father once held. On November 6, Murphy lost the election to incumbent Republican Michael Grimm, 46.2% – 52.8%.

Death 
Murphy died the age of 88 on May 25, 2015, at Richmond University Medical Center in Staten Island, NY of complications from a heart attack.

See also
 List of American federal politicians convicted of crimes
 List of federal political scandals in the United States

References

|-

|-

1926 births
2015 deaths
20th-century American politicians
Abscam
Democratic Party members of the United States House of Representatives from New York (state)
New York (state) politicians convicted of crimes
People from Staten Island
Politicians convicted of illegal gratuities under 18 U.S.C. § 201
Politicians convicted of conspiracy to defraud the United States
New York (state) politicians convicted of corruption
Recipients of the Distinguished Service Cross (United States)
United States Military Academy alumni
Prisoners and detainees of the United States federal government